Grand Bend is a community located on the shores of Lake Huron in Southwestern Ontario, Canada. It is part of the Municipality of Lambton Shores in Lambton County.

History 
Grand Bend is situated on the traditional territory of the Attawandaron and Ojibwe/Chippewa First Nations. It was ceded to the crown as part of a parcel called the Huron Tract, in Treaty 27, 1829.  In the 1830s a group of English and Scottish settlers bought lots from the Canada Company, a land development firm. One of the original settlers, Benjamin Brewster gave his name to the village after he and his business partner David Smart secured rights to dam the Ausable River and started a sawmill in 1832. The villagers were mainly the families of the millhands and fishermen. Their homesteads were situated on the south side of the present village, but Grand Bend was originally founded and discovered by Frank Salter, who was a very well-known Lake resort owner and country club developer.

For twenty years Brewster existed as an isolated lumbering community. Until the opening of the highway to Goderich in 1850, both people and provisions had to travel by water. Once road connections were complete, the village was no longer solely dependent on the forests for its livelihood and opportunities for new businesses emerged.

Typical of many pioneer communities, the village assumed many different names throughout its history— Brewster's Mills, Websterville, and Sommerville are all recorded. Early French Canadian settlers in the area referred to the present location of the village as "Aux Crochet", 'at the bends'. Grand Bend survived as a name, perhaps because it was the most appropriate— the tight hairpin turn in the original Ausable River where mills were first established.

Land ownership controversies

Noble v Alley
Improved roads and the arrival of the automobile near the turn of the century had the greatest influence on the growth of Grand Bend. Businesses were established to serve visitors and travellers along the highway, and with the beach, "The Bend" became a summer destination. In the 1940s, however, Grand Bend became the centre of a major controversy in the landmark court case of Noble v Alley. Wolf, a London, Ontario merchant, faced court challenges when he purchased property at Beach O'Pines in contravention of a restrictive covenant that prohibited the ownership of lots or cottages by persons of "Jewish, Hebrew, Semitic, Negro or coloured race or blood". The case was finally heard by the Supreme Court of Canada which ruled that the restrictive covenant as constituted was invalid.

Gibbs v Grand Bend
Although successful at trial in 1989, it was overturned at the Ontario Court of Appeal in 1995, which held that, while the beach did not constitute lands reserved to the Crown, the owners had lost ownership to it over the years because of implied dedication and acceptance for public recreational use. As he was required to give the public access to the beach, he subsequently charged parking fees to the visitors and personally cleaned up the beach every night. In 1998 he reached agreement with the province and the village of Grand Bend to sell the property. There was a separate continuing ownership dispute relating to the harbour at the mouth of the Ausable River.

Present day
Grand Bend is home to a variety of stores and eateries. The main strip is the centre of activity in the town, with shopping during the day and night life venues during the evening drawing crowds. The atmosphere of Grand Bend has given the town a reputation of being Florida north. As well as Main Street, Grand Bend acts as a regional cultural centre, boasting art galleries in the town and the Huron Country Playhouse on the outskirts.

Today, Grand Bend's year-round population of 2,000 people swells to about 50,000 in the summer months on holiday weekends. The demographic population of Grand Bend is quite diverse. Families owning vacation homes in the adjacent communities of Oakwood Park, Southcott Pines and Beach O' Pines, are from Ontario, Michigan and as far as New York, Florida, Texas and the American west coast. Among these are the Romney family.

The town as well serves as the backdrop of the docu-drama MTV Show Grand Benders, filmed from 2011 to the present and produced by MDF Productions.

The Pinery Provincial Park and the Lambton Heritage Museum are located seven kilometres south of Grand Bend. Also, in the vicinity one can explore a number of 'Gems of Nature' accessible by marked and maintained hiking trails.

Grand Bend Motorplex has a dragstrip that hosts an International Hot Rod Association race and the IHRA Canadian Nationals, Canada's longest running and largest drag race.

See also
 Bosanquet, Ontario
 Forest, Lambton County, Ontario
 Lambton County
 Lambton Shores, Ontario
 Port Franks, Ontario

References

External links
 

Populated places on Lake Huron in Canada
Communities in Lambton County
Former villages in Ontario